The 1991–92 Mississippi Valley State Delta Devils basketball team represented Mississippi Valley State University during the 1991–92 NCAA Division I men's basketball season. The Delta Devils, led by head coach Lafayette Stribling, played their home games at Harrison HPER Complex as members of the Southwestern Athletic Conference. The Delta Devils finished the season 16–14, 11–3 in SWAC play to be crowned SWAC regular season champions. They also won the SWAC Basketball tournament to earn the conference's automatic bid into the 1992 NCAA tournament. As the No. 16 seed in the Southeast Region, the Delta Devils were beaten by Ohio State in the opening round, 83–56.

Roster

Schedule and results

|-
!colspan=9 style=| Regular season

|-
!colspan=9 style=| SWAC tournament

|-
!colspan=9 style=| 1992 NCAA tournament

References

Mississippi Valley State Delta Devils basketball seasons
Mississippi Valley State
Mississippi Valley State
Mississippi Valley
Mississippi Valley